This is a list of State Presidents of the South African Republic (Before 1866  and after 1866 ). 

The country was referred as the Transvaal Republic by the British.

List

Last election

See also
State President of the Orange Free State
State Secretary of the South African Republic
State Attorney of the South African Republic

References

External links

Archontology.org: South African Republic (Transvaal): Heads of State: 1857–1902

South African Republic